NIC México (Network Information Centre Mexico) or NIC.MX is the non-profit organization in charge of the registry for the .mx country code top-level domain (ccTLD). NIC Mexico is also responsible for the National Internet Registry which manages the allocation of IP address space to Mexican internet service providers.

History
NIC México was created in February 1989 when the Monterrey Institute of Technology and Higher Education received the .mx delegation.

In 2001 NIC Mexico established the external Advisory Committee with the aim to discuss relevant and strategic issues regarding the .MX policies.

Registrars
NIC Mexico finished its Extensible Provisioning Protocol (EPP) implementation in July 2008 and started the accreditation of domain name registrars for the commercialization of .mx domain names. A list of current accredited .mx registrars show more than 180 after one year of operation of this model.

International 
NIC Mexico is a founding member of LACNIC and LACTLD. NIC Mexico is member of the Country Code Names Supporting Organization ccNSO, which is part of the ICANN structure.

Along with eCOM-LAC (Federation of Latin-America and the Caribbean for the Internet and Electronic Commerce), NIC Mexico proposed .lat as a generic top-level domain (gTLD) for Latin American communities, which was approved in 2015.

See also
.mx
LACNIC

References

External links
NIC Mexico Registry - official site.
LACTLD - Latin American and Caribbean Country Code Top Level Domain Organization.

Internet in Mexico
Domain name registries